This is a list of current governors of the provinces of Zimbabwe. The governors of each province, officially titled Ministers of State, are appointed by the President.

Current governors

See also 

 Politics of Zimbabwe

References

List
Governors
governors